Två tungor (English: Two tongues) is an album by the Swedish folk singer-songwriter and guitar player Fred Åkerström.

The title song is a Swedish version of a poem by Norwegian Inger Hagerup, while Jag Ger Dig Min Morgon (English: I give you the morning) is a translation of a song by Tom Paxton from the 1969 LP The Things I Notice Now.

Track listing
 Jag Ger Dig Min Morgon (Paxton, Åkerström) 3:47
 Berceuse (Paxton, Åkerström) 2:54
 Oslo (Åkerström) 2:33
 Två Tungor (Hagerup, Kalvik, Åkerström) 1:59
 Sannah (Åkerström) 2:53
 Natt I En Stad (Nilsen, Åkerström) 2:49
 Den Gamle Skärsliparen (Andersen, Åkerström, Pedersen) 5:41
 Spritarnas Tango (Åkerström) 0:44
 Vissångarvisa (Åkerström) 3:25
 Visa Till Ombudsmän (Andersson, Åkerström) 4:14
 Till Gruvtolvan (Åkerström) 1:02
 Den Trettionde I Första Sjuttitvå (Åkerström) 3:55

External links
 Lyrics

References

1972 albums
Fred Åkerström albums
Swedish-language albums